Serge Boutouli (born 21 May 1988 in Bangui) is a footballer from the Central African Republic who plays as a midfielder for the Central African Republic national team.

External links

Living people
1988 births
People from Bangui
Central African Republic footballers
Association football midfielders
Central African Republic international footballers